The 1968 Alcorn A&M Braves football team was an American football team that represented Alcorn A&M University in the Southwestern Athletic Conference (SWAC) during 1968 NCAA College Division football season. In their third season under head coach Marino Casem, Alcorn compiled a 9–1 record (7–1 against conference opponents), won the SWAC championship, and outscored opponents by a total of 359 to 85.

Alcorn A&M was also recognized as the black college national champion.

Schedule

References

Alcorn A&M
Alcorn State Braves football seasons
Black college football national champions
Southwestern Athletic Conference football champion seasons
Alcorn A&M football